Ling Shuw-chow (born 5 May 1909 – November 1987) was a Taiwanese hurdler who represented China. He competed in the men's 110 metres hurdles at the 1936 Summer Olympics.

References

1909 births
1987 deaths
Athletes (track and field) at the 1936 Summer Olympics
Chinese male hurdlers
Olympic athletes of China
Taiwanese male hurdlers
Taiwanese emigrants to China
Xiamen University alumni
Sportspeople from Tainan